This is a list of the top 50 singles in New Zealand of 1988 as compiled by Recorded Music NZ in the end-of-year chart of the Official New Zealand Music Chart. Six singles by New Zealand artists are included on the chart, the highest being the Holidaymakers' debut single "Sweet Lovers" at No. 1.

Chart 
Key
 – Single of New Zealand origin

References 

1988 in music
1988 record charts
Singles 1988